The Assembly of Ceuta is the regional legislature of the autonomous city of Ceuta, an exclave of Spain located on the north coast of Africa.

The Assembly has 25 members, elected by universal suffrage. Following an election, the members of the Assembly select a Mayor-President to serve as the head of government for the city.

References 
 Ley Orgánica 1/1995, Estatuto de Autonomía de Ceuta

 
Ceuta